Parchhaiyan is a 1972 Bollywood drama film directed by Sharankumar Chand. The film stars Vinod Khanna and Reshma.

Cast
Vinod Khanna as Dilip Khanna / Rakesh
Reshma as Sudha
Bindu as Rangee
Sujit Kumar as Mohan
Ranjeet as Ranjeet
Mohan Choti as Ramesh
Iftekhar as Choudhary Shyamlal
Indrani Mukherjee as Seeta   
Murad as Judge Khanna
Sajjan as Sandeep Narayan   
Meena T. as Rekha

Soundtrack

External links
 

1972 films
1970s Hindi-language films
1972 drama films
Films scored by R. D. Burman